Hakverdi is a Turkish surname. "Hak" means "right" and "verdi" means "gave" in Turkish.

Related last names 
Haghverdi  (Persian: حق‌وردی‎) is a Persian surname.

Haghverdian (Armenian: Հախվերդեան; Persian: حق‌وردیان‎) is an Armenian related surname.

Notable people with the surname include 
 Ali Haydar Hakverdi (born 1979), Turkish politician
 Metin Hakverdi (born 1969), German lawyer and politician
 Karo Haghverdian (born 1945), retired Iranian Armenian football player.
 Hojjat Haghverdi (born  1993) is a footballer who plays as a defender for Sumgayit.
 Laleh Haghverdi, Iranian physicist who won the 2017 Erwin Schrödinger Prize for her PhD work
 Tooraj Haghverdi (born  1993), Iranian football referee.

References